The Pride of Company Three (German: Der Stolz der 3. Kompanie) is a 1932 German comedy film directed by Fred Sauer and starring Heinz Rühmann, Anton Walbrook and Eugen Burg. It premiered on 4 January 1932. It was shot at the Staaken Studios in Berlin. The film's sets were designed by the art directors Robert Neppach and Erwin Scharf.

Synopsis
The film is set in pre-1914 Germany. It follows the tangled love lives of a group of soldiers at a military barracks.

Cast

References

Bibliography
 Grange, William. Cultural Chronicle of the Weimar Republic. Scarecrow Press, 2008.

External links

1932 films
1932 comedy films
German comedy films
Films of the Weimar Republic
1930s German-language films
Films directed by Fred Sauer
Films set in the 1910s
Military humor in film
German black-and-white films
Films shot at Staaken Studios
1930s German films